What Ever Happened to Baby Jane? is a 1962 American psychological horror thriller film directed and produced by Robert Aldrich, from a screenplay by Lukas Heller, based on the 1960 novel of the same name by Henry Farrell. The film stars Bette Davis and Joan Crawford, and features the major film debut of Victor Buono. It follows an aging former child star tormenting her paraplegic sister, a former movie star, in an old Hollywood mansion.

What Ever Happened to Baby Jane? was theatrically released in the United States on October 31, 1962, by Warner Bros. Pictures. The film was met with critical acclaim and was a box office success. It was nominated for five Academy Awards and won one for Best Costume Design, Black-and-White, with Davis receiving her tenth and final nomination for Best Actress.

The intensely bitter Hollywood rivalry between the film's two stars, Davis and Crawford, was pivotal to the film's initial success. This in part led to the revitalization of the careers of the two stars. In the years after release, critics continued to acclaim the film for its psychologically driven black comedy, camp, and creation of the psycho-biddy subgenre. The film's novel and controversial plot meant that it originally received an X rating in the U.K. Because of the appeal of the film's stars, Dave Itzkoff in The New York Times has identified it as being a "cult classic". It has also gone on to become an enduring favorite with queer audiences.

In 2003, the character of Baby Jane Hudson was ranked No. 44 on the American Film Institute's list of the 50 Best Villains of American Cinema.

In 2021, the film was selected for preservation in the United States National Film Registry by the Library of Congress as being "culturally, historically, or aesthetically significant".

Plot
In 1917, "Baby Jane" Hudson is a spoiled and capricious child actress who performs in vaudeville theatres across the country with her father, who acts as her manager and accompanies her on stage on the piano. Her success is such that a line of porcelain dolls is made in her image. Meanwhile, her shy older sister Blanche lives in her shadow and is treated with contempt by the haughty Jane. As the sisters pass adolescence, their situations undergo a reversal; Jane's style of performing falls out of fashion, and her career declines as she descends into alcoholism, while Blanche becomes an acclaimed Hollywood actress. Mindful of a promise made to their mother, Blanche attempts to maintain a semblance of a career for Jane, going as far as to prevail on producers to guarantee acting roles for her. One evening in 1935, Blanche's career is cut short when she is paralyzed from the waist down in a mysterious car accident that is unofficially blamed on Jane, who is found three days later in a drunken stupor.

By 1962, Blanche and Jane are living together in a mansion purchased with Blanche's movie earnings. Blanche's mobility is limited due to her reliance on a wheelchair and the lack of an elevator to her upstairs bedroom. Jane, psychotic and resentful of Blanche's success, regularly mistreats Blanche and prepares to revive her old act with hired pianist Edwin Flagg. When Blanche informs Jane she intends to sell the house, Jane rightly suspects Blanche will commit her to a psychiatric hospital once the house is sold. She removes the telephone from Blanche's bedroom, cutting her off from the outside world. During Jane's absence, Blanche desperately drags herself down the stairs and calls her doctor for help. Jane returns to find Blanche on the phone and beats her unconscious before mimicking Blanche's voice to dismiss the doctor. After tying Blanche to her bed and locking her in her room, Jane abruptly fires their housekeeper, Elvira, when she comes to work. While Jane is away, the suspicious Elvira sneaks into the house and attempts to access Blanche's room. Concerned by the lack of a response, Elvira tries to break open the door with a hammer. Jane returns home and reluctantly gives Elvira the key. As soon as Elvira enters Blanche's room, Jane takes the hammer and kills Elvira. Edwin comes by the house but Jane won't answer the door. That night she uses Blanche's wheelchair to move Elvira's body to her car.

A few days later, the police call to tell Jane that Elvira's cousin has reported her missing. Jane panics and prepares to leave, taking Blanche with her. Before they can go, an inebriated Edwin is escorted to the house by police, who leave him there. He discovers Blanche bound to her bed. Edwin flees and notifies the authorities. Jane, in a fit of infantile regression, takes Blanche to a beach where she sang as a child.

The next morning the news of Elvira's disappearance and Blanche's condition is on the radio and the police are on the lookout. Blanche — lying starved, dehydrated, and near death on a blanket — stirs and tells the real story of the car accident to relieve Jane of guilt, saying she is paraplegic by her own fault: On the night of the accident, Blanche tried to run Jane over because she was angry at her drunken sister for mocking her at a party earlier that night. Blanche's spine broke when her car struck the iron gates outside their mansion, and she dragged herself in front of the car's hood to stage the cause of accident and frame Jane. Blanche took advantage of Jane's shock and subsequent bender, concealing the real cause of the accident from her, which subjected Jane to a life of guilt, loneliness, and servitude. Now aware of the truth, a saddened Jane responds "You mean all this time, we could have been friends?" When Jane gets ice cream for herself and Blanche from a nearby refreshment stand, she is recognized by two police officers, who ask her to lead them to Blanche, attracting the attention of nearby beachgoers. Jane dodges the officers' inquiry and dances before the crowd of curious onlookers. The officers find Blanche nearby and rush to save her, as the end credit rolls.

Cast

Production

The house exterior of the Hudson mansion is located at 172 South McCadden Place in the neighborhood of Hancock Park, Los Angeles. Other residential exteriors show cottages on DeLongpre Avenue near Harvard Avenue in Hollywood without their current gated courtyards. The scene on the beach was filmed near Aldrich's beach house in Malibu, the same site where Aldrich filmed the final scene of Kiss Me Deadly (1955). The beach house's exterior is briefly visible during the film's final scenes.

Footage from the Bette Davis films Parachute Jumper and Ex-Lady (both 1933) and the Joan Crawford film Sadie McKee (1934) was used to represent the film acting of Jane and Blanche, respectively.

The character of Liza, Mrs. Bates' daughter, was played by Davis's real-life daughter B. D. Merrill.

In a 1972 telephone conversation, Crawford told author Shaun Considine that after seeing the film she urged Davis to go and have a look. When she failed to hear back from her co-star, Crawford called Davis and asked her what she thought of the film. Davis replied, "You were so right, Joan. The picture is good. And I was terrific." Crawford said, "That was it. She never said anything about my performance. Not a word."

During the filming of Hush...Hush, Sweet Charlotte (1964), Crawford acknowledged to visiting reporter and author Lawrence J. Quirk the difficulty she was having with Davis because of the Oscar incident, but added, "She acted like Baby Jane was a one-woman show after they nominated her. What was I supposed to do? Let her hog all the glory, act like I hadn't even been in the movie? She got the nomination. I didn't begrudge her that, but it would have been nice if she'd been a little gracious in interviews and given me a little credit. I would've done so for her."

Release

Critical reception

Contemporary reviews were mixed. In a generally negative review in The New York Times, Bosley Crowther observed, "[Davis and Crawford] do get off some amusing and eventually blood-chilling displays of screaming sororal hatred and general monstrousness ... The feeble attempts that Mr. Aldrich has made to suggest the irony of two once idolized and wealthy females living in such depravity, and the pathos of their deep-seated envy having brought them to this, wash out very quickly under the flood of sheer grotesquerie. There is nothing moving or particularly significant about these two." Philip K. Scheuer of the Los Angeles Times also panned the film, writing that Crawford and Davis had been turned into "grotesque caricatures of themselves" and that the film "mocks not only its characters but also the sensibilities of its audience." The Chicago Tribune wrote, "This isn't a movie, it's a caricature. Bette Davis' make-up could very well have been done by Charles Addams, Joan Crawford's perils make those of Pauline look like good, clean fun and the plot piles one fantastic twist upon another until it all becomes nonsensical." Brendan Gill of The New Yorker was somewhat negative as well, calling the film "far from being a Hitchcock—it goes on and on, in a light much dimmer than necessary, and the climax, when it belatedly arrives, is a bungled, languid mingling of pursuers and pursued which put me in mind of Last Year at Marienbad. Still, Bette Davis and Joan Crawford do get a chance to carry on like mad things, which at least one of them is supposed to be."

Among the positive reviews, Variety stated that after a slow and overlong introduction the film became "an emotional toboggan ride," adding, "Although the results heavily favor Davis (and she earns the credit), it should be recognized that the plot, of necessity, allows her to run unfettered through all the stages of oncoming insanity ... Crawford gives a quiet, remarkably fine interpretation of the crippled Blanche, held in emotionally by the nature and temperament of the role." Richard L. Coe of The Washington Post also liked the film, writing that "Miss Davis has the showiest role and bites into it with all her admired force, looking a fright from head to foot. I doubt if she would regret some of the laughs she gets. She plays for them and psychologically, they are needed. If Miss Crawford has the passive role, that is not without rewards. Suffering is one of her particular gifts." The Monthly Film Bulletin wrote that numerous directorial techniques, including all the plunging shots down the staircase, made the film look "rather like an anthology of the oldest and most hackneyed devices in thrillerdom. And yet, in its curious Gothic way, the film works marvelously, though mainly as a field-day for its actors."

In Sight & Sound, Peter John Dyer stated that the film had "a frequent air of incompetence," writing of Aldrich's direction that "Like some textbook student of Hitchcock who never got beyond Blackmail, he dispenses suspense with ham-fisted conventionality." Dyer did praise the performances of the leads, however, finding that they seemed to have found "a new maturity, a discipline encouraged perhaps by the confined sets and Crawford's wheelchair, or by the interaction of their professional rivalry upon a belated mutual respect."

More recent assessments have been more uniformly positive. On review aggregator website Rotten Tomatoes the film holds an approval rating of 92% based on 51 reviews, with an average rating of 7.91/10. The site's critical consensus reads, "What Ever Happened to Baby Jane? combines powerhouse acting, rich atmosphere, and absorbing melodrama in service of a taut thriller with thought-provoking subtext." On Metacritic, the film has a weighted average score of 75 out of 100 based on 15 critics, indicating "generally favorable reviews".

In a retrospective review, TV Guide awarded the film four stars, calling it "Star wars, trenchantly served" and adding, "If it sometimes looks like a poisonous senior citizen show with over-the-top spoiled ham, just try to look away ... As in the best Hitchcock movies, suspense, rather than actual mayhem, drives the film."

The Japanese filmmaker Akira Kurosawa cited What ever happened to Baby Jane? as one of his favorite films.

Awards and nominations

Box office
The film was a box office hit, grossing $9 million in theatrical rentals in North America. giving both Bette Davis and Joan Crawford their biggest hit in over a decade.

In the United Kingdom, the film was given an X certificate by the BBFC in 1962, with a few minor cuts. These cuts were waived for a video submission, which was given an 18 certificate in 1988, meaning no one under 18 years of age could purchase a copy of the film. However, in 2004, the film was re-submitted for a theatrical re-release, and it was given a 12A certificate, now meaning persons under 12 years of age could view it if accompanied by an adult. It remains at this category to this day.

Legacy

The film's success spawned a succession of horror/thriller films featuring psychotic older women, later dubbed the psycho-biddy subgenre, among them Aldrich's Hush...Hush, Sweet Charlotte, What Ever Happened to Aunt Alice?, and director Curtis Harrington's Whoever Slew Auntie Roo? and What's the Matter with Helen?. It was parodied by the Italian comedy film What Ever Happened to Baby Toto?

Shaun Considine's book Bette and Joan: The Divine Feud (1989) chronicles the actresses' rivalry, including their experience shooting this film.

Comedy duo French and Saunders (Jennifer Saunders and Dawn French) created a BBC episode called "Whatever Happened to Baby Dawn?" on 22 March 1990. French and Saunders also made a radio play about feuding sisters called "Whatever Happened To Baby Jane Austen" in 2021.

In 1991, the film was remade as a television film starring real-life sisters Vanessa and Lynn Redgrave.

In 2005, a part of the movie appears on House of Wax, another Warner Bros. horror movie.

In 2006, Christina Aguilera adopted a new alter ego called Baby Jane after Bette Davis' character in the film.

In Season 2, Episode 4 of RuPaul's Drag Race All Stars, the drag queens' acting chops are tested in parody film sequels of RuPaul's favorite films. A parody of ''What Ever Happened to Baby Jane?'' called ''Wha' Ha' Happened to Baby JJ?'' was made by Alaska and Alyssa Edwards.

The backstage battle between Crawford and Davis during the production of the film is the basis for the 2017 miniseries Feud, which stars Jessica Lange as Crawford and Susan Sarandon as Davis and created by Ryan Murphy.

References

External links

 
 
 
 
 

1960s thriller films
1960s psychological thriller films
1960s thriller drama films
1962 films
1962 drama films
American black-and-white films
American thriller films
American psychological films
American psychological thriller films
American thriller drama films
1960s English-language films
Films about actors
Films about filmmaking
Films about paraplegics or quadriplegics
Films about sisters
Films based on American thriller novels
Films directed by Robert Aldrich
Films scored by Frank De Vol
Films set in 1917
Films set in 1935
Films set in 1962
Films set in country houses
Films set in Los Angeles
Films set on beaches
Films shot in Los Angeles
Films that won the Best Costume Design Academy Award
Psycho-biddy films
United States National Film Registry films
1960s American films
Films about disability